CryEngine (stylized as CRYENGINE) is a game engine designed by the German game developer Crytek. It has been used in all of their titles with the initial version being used in Far Cry, and continues to be updated to support new consoles and hardware for their games. It has also been used for many third-party games under Crytek's licensing scheme, including Sniper: Ghost Warrior 2 and SNOW. Warhorse Studios uses a modified version of the engine for their medieval RPG Kingdom Come: Deliverance. Ubisoft maintains an in-house, heavily modified version of CryEngine from the original Far Cry called the Dunia Engine, which is used in their later iterations of the Far Cry series.

According to various anonymous reports in April 2015, CryEngine was licensed to Amazon for $50–70 million. Consequently, in February 2016, Amazon released its own reworked and extended version of CryEngine under the name of Amazon Lumberyard.

Features

Versions

CryEngine 1
CryEngine 1 is a game engine used for the first-person shooter video game Far Cry. It was originally developed by Crytek as a technology demo for Nvidia and, when the company saw its potential, it was turned into a game. When video cards with support for 3.0 pixel and vertex shaders were released, Crytek released version 1.2 of the engine which used some of the capabilities for better graphics. Later the company developed CryEngine version 1.3, which added support for HDR lighting. The engine has been licensed to NCsoft for their MMORPG, Aion: The Tower of Eternity. On March 30, 2006, Ubisoft acquired all intellectual property rights to the Far Cry franchise and a perpetual license to use the Far Cry edition of CryEngine, known as the Dunia Engine.

CryEngine 2
CryEngine 2 is used in Crytek's game Crysis, and an updated version in Crysis Warhead, a side story of Crysis. It was first licensed out to French company IMAGTP who specializes in architectural and urban-planning communication. The purpose of licensing the engine was to create a program to allow clients to see exactly what a building or other structure would look like before any actual construction was started. As of March 7, 2011, Simpson Studios has licensed CryEngine 2 out to use on a Massively Multiplayer Virtual World (MMVW) that takes place on a terraformed Mars. On May 11, 2007, Crytek announced that they would be using the engine to create a game based on their new “intellectual property”. It is also confirmed that it would not be a part of Crysis and in fact may not even be a first-person shooter. On September 17, 2007, Ringling College of Art & Design became the first higher education institution in the world to license CryEngine 2 for educational purposes.

CryEngine 3
Crytek introduced CryEngine 3 at the 2009 Game Developers Conference, held from March 25 to March 27 and demonstrated it on the Xbox 360 and PlayStation 3 consoles. The new engine was being developed for use on Microsoft Windows, PlayStation 3, Xbox 360, and Wii U. As for the PC platform, the engine is said to support development in DirectX 9, 10, and 11. As of June 1, 2009, it was announced that Crysis 2 would be developed by Crytek on their brand-new engine. CryEngine 3 was released on October 14, 2009.

On March 1, 2010, a new tech demo of the engine was released for the i3D 2010 symposium, which demonstrates 'Cascaded Light Propagation Volumes for Real Time Indirect Illumination'. On June 11, 2011, the Australian Defence Force revealed that Navy personnel would train on a virtual landing helicopter dock ship made using the CryEngine 3 software. As of July 1, 2011, the Mod SDK version of CryEngine 3 specifically to create custom maps, mods and content for Crysis 2 is available on Crytek's website. Crytek also released a free-to-use version of the CryEngine for non-commercial game development. It was released as of August 17, 2011 under the name CRYENGINE® Free SDK.

Crytek announced on September 9, 2011, that they would be using CryEngine 3 to bring the original Crysis to consoles. It was released for Xbox Live and PlayStation Network on October 4, 2011.

CryEngine (3.6–4)
On August 21, 2013, Crytek rebranded CryEngine (starting from version 3.6.0) to simply "CryEngine", and announced that their next CryEngine would not be advertised with a version number. The reason for this decision was the claim that this new engine bears almost no similarity to previous CryEngine versions. However, the development kits available to licensees still use version numbers. The new CryEngine version adds support for Linux and consoles such as the PlayStation 4, Xbox One, and Wii U. Subsequent appearances at events have also featured the use of CryEngine on virtual reality systems, at GDC 2015 Crytek brought a demonstration 'Back To Dinosaur Island' to the event to showcase such.

CryEngine V 
On March 22, 2016, Crytek announced a new version of CryEngine, called CryEngine V. Additionally, a new licensing model was introduced with a "pay what you want" model for usage and access to the source code.

On September 21, 2017, CryEngine 5.4 was released, adding the Vulkan API renderer as a beta, substance integration, and other features including new C# templates, asset system updates, and new anti-aliasing techniques.

On March 20, 2018, Crytek changed the licensing from "pay what you want" to a 5% revenue-sharing model.

In 2022 5.7 version was released with few new features as the features claimed to be in 5.7 were scraped and moved to new CryEngine 6. 5.7 included Scaleform 4 support. The developers have stated that this will be the last version of CryEngine 5 and confirmed they are working on new iteration of CryEngine. The previous versions (before 5.7) were deprecated and can't be downloaded.

CryEngine 6 
Crytek has confirmed that they are working on new CryEngine version. It is not known what features it will include right now. The developers have stated that it will improve global illumination system and will probably include ray tracing as well as stable DirectX 12 support. Beta program for the engine will also be available.

Development
The CryEngine software development kit (SDK), originally called Sandbox Editor, is the current version of the level editor used to create levels for CryEngine by Crytek. Tools are also provided within the software to facilitate scripting, animation, and object creation. It has been included with various Crytek games (including, but not limited to, Crysis and Far Cry), and is used extensively for modding purposes. The editing style is that of the sandbox concept, with the emphasis on large terrains and a free style of mission programming. The editor can also construct indoor settings.

As opposed to editors like UnrealEd, which use a "subtractive" editing style that takes away areas from a filled world space, the Sandbox has an "additive" style (like Quake II). Objects are added to an overall empty space. The Sandbox's concentration on potentially huge (in theory, hundreds of square kilometers) terrain, means that it uses an algorithmic form of painting textures and objects onto the landscape. This uses various parameters to define the distribution of textures or types of vegetation. This is intended to save time and make the editing of such large terrains feasible while maintaining the overall "real world" sandbox free roaming style. This is different from some editing styles that often use "fake backdrops" to give the illusion of large terrains.

In a fashion somewhat comparable to the 3D Renderer Blender, which can be used for game design, the Sandbox editor has the ability, with a single key press, for the editor to jump straight into the current design (WYSIWYP, "What You See Is What You Play" Feature). This is facilitated without loading the game as the game engine is already running within the editor. The "player" view is shown within the 3D portion of the Editor. The Editor also supports all the CryEngine features such as vehicles and physics, scripting, advanced lighting (including real time, moving shadows), Polybump technology, shaders, 3D audio, character inverse kinematics and animation blending, dynamic music, Real Time Soft Particle System and Integrated FX Editor, Deferred Lighting, Normal Maps & Parallax Occlusion Maps, and Advanced Modular AI System.

References

External links

 Developer Crytek official website
 CryEngine and Launcher (CryEngine's engine launcher) release notes page
 CryEngine Manual

2004 software
Game engines for Linux
Game engines that support Mantle (API)
Lua (programming language)-scriptable game engines
Proprietary software that uses Qt
Video game development software
Video game engines
.NET game engines
Virtual reality